The sheriff of the City of Cork is the court officer responsible for the enforcement of civil judgments in Cork county borough. The current sheriff is a solicitor, Martin A Harvey. Sheriffs earn their fees from poundage (commission). Before 1842 two sheriffs (and the Mayor) were voted into office annually by the freemen of the city. After that time, the power of appointment of a single sheriff per year was vested in the crown.

The sheriff also performs the duties of the returning officer in elections (other than local elections) and some other duties concerning pounds. Sheriffs may appoint court messengers, subject to the approval of the Minister for Justice, to assist them with their work.

Sheriffs of Cork city
1614: Nicholas Lombard
1626: David Lombard
1657: John Hodder of Bridgetown
1661: Christopher Rye
1665: John Newenham

18th century

19th century

High Sheriffs of the City of Cork

20th century

References

Mayors and Sheriffs of Cork

Cork City
History of County Cork